Răzvan Rusu (born March 4, 1988, in București) is a Romanian weightlifter.

At the 2008 Junior World Weightlifting Championships he ranked 9th in the 85 kg category, with a total of 313 kg.

He competed in Weightlifting at the 2008 Summer Olympics in the 77 kg division finishing eighteenth with 310 kg.

He is 5 ft 9 inches tall and weighs 170 lb.

Notes and references

External links
 NBC profile
 Athlete Biography RUSU Razvan at beijing2008

1988 births
Living people
Romanian male weightlifters
Weightlifters at the 2008 Summer Olympics
Olympic weightlifters of Romania
Sportspeople from Bucharest
20th-century Romanian people
21st-century Romanian people